Slatterites is an extinct genus of lower Jurassic ammonite that lived during upper Sinemurian. Animals belonging to this genus had small shells that had oxycone whorl section and sharp venter when young. In the case of older specimens, whorl section becomes oval and venter is round. This change is very quick. Last whorl is decorated by blunt ribs that can be alternating on opposite sides. Suture is by broad and simple elements similar to suture of Eparietites.

Distribution
Fossils belonging to this genus were found in England.

References

Oxynoticeratidae
Ammonitida genera
Jurassic ammonites of Europe
Sinemurian life